The Anoplocephalidae are a family of tapeworms containing the genera Bertiella, Anoplocephala, Paranoplocephala, Moniezia, and others.

Genera
Genera:
 Afrobaeria Haukisalmi, 2008
 Afrojoyeuxia Haukisalmi, 2013
 Andrya Railliet, 1893
 Anoplocephala Blanchard, 1848
 Anoplocephaloides Baer, 1923
 Anoplocephaloides Rausch, 1976
 Aporina Fuhrmann, 1902
 Arctocestus Haukisalmi, Hardman, Hoberg & Henttonen, 2014
 Atriotaenia Sandground, 1926
 Avitellina Gough, 1911
 Beringitaenia Haukisalmi, Hardman, Hoberg & Henttonen, 2014
 Bertiella Stiles & Hassell, 1902
 Biporonterina Burt, 1973
 Bulbultaenia Beveridge, 1994
 Bulbutaenia Beveridge, 1994
 Chionocestus Haukisalmi, Hardman, Hoberg & Henttonen, 2014
 Cittotaenia Riehm, 1881
 Cleberia Arandos Rêgo, 1967
 Coelodela Shipley, 1900
 Cookiella Haukisalmi, Hardman, Hoberg & Henttonen, 2014
 Crossotaenia Mahon, 1954
 Ctenotaenia Railliet, 1893
 Cycloskrjabinia Spasskii, 1951
 Damanocephala Spassky & Buga, 2007
 Diandrya Darrah, 1930
 Diuterinotaenia Gvozdev, 1961
 Doublesetina Srivastava & Srivastav, 1989
 Douthittia Haukisalmi, Hardman, Hoberg & Henttonen, 2014
 Echidnotaenia Beveridge, 1980
 Ectopocephalium Rausch & Ohbayashi, 1974
 ??? Equinia Haukisalmi, 2009
 Eurotaenia Haukisalmi, Hardman, Hoberg & Henttonen, 2014
 Flabelloskrjabinia Spasskii, 1951
 Francolina Capoor, Sawada, Bhalya & Rastogi, 1987
 Gallegoides Tenora & Mas-Coma, 1978
 Gekkotaenia Bursey, Goldberg & Kraus, 2005
 Genovia Haukisalmi, 2009
 Gulyaevia Haukisalmi, Hardman, Hoberg & Henttonen, 2014
 Hemiparonia Baer, 1925
 Hickmawia Spasskii, 1987
 Hokkaidocephala Tenora, Gulyaev & Kamiya, 1999
 Hunkeleriella Haukisalmi, 2013
 Inermicapsifer Janicki, 1910
 Inermicapsiper Janicki, 1910
 Killigrewia Meggitt, 1927
 Lemminia Haukisalmi, Hardman, Hoberg & Henttonen, 2014
 Leporidotaenia Genov, Murai, Georgiev & Harris, 1990
 Linstowia Zschokke, 1899
 Marmotocephala Gvozdev, Zhigileva & Gulyaev, 2004
 Mathevotaenia Akhumyan, 1946
 Metacapsifer Spasskii, 1951
 Microcephaloides Haukisalmi, Hardman, Hardman, Rausch & Henttonen, 2008
 Microticola Haukisalmi, Hardman, Hoberg & Henttonen, 2014
 Moniezia Blanchard, 1891
 Moniezoides Fuhrmann, 1918
 Monoecocestus Beddard, 1914
 Mosgovoyia Spasskii, 1951
 Multicapsiferina Fuhrmann, 1922
 Neandrya Haukisalmi & Wickström, 2005
 Neoaporina Saxena & Baugh, 1973
 Neoctenotaenia Tenora, 1976
 Oochoristica Lühe, 1898
 Panceriella Stunkard, 1969
 Paralinstowia Baer, 1927
 Paramonieza
 Paramoniezia Maplestone & Southwell, 1923
 Parandrya Gulyaev & Chechulin, 1996
 Paranoplocephala Lühe, 1910
 Paranoplocephaloides Gulyaev, 1996
 Parasciurotaenia Haukisalmi, 2009
 Paronia Diamare, 1900
 Paucicapsula Kugi, 1993
 Pericapsifer Spasski, 1951
 Pericpasifer Spasskii, 1951
 Phascolocestus Beveridge, 2014
 Phascolotaenia Beveridge, 1976
 Pritchardia Gardner, Agustín Jimenez & Campbell, 2013
 Progamotaenia Nybelin, 1917
 Pseudocittotaenia Tenora, 1976
 Pulluterina Smithers, 1954
 Rauschoides Haukisalmi, Hardman, Hoberg & Henttonen, 2014
 Rodentocestus Haukisalmi, Hardman, Hoberg & Henttonen, 2014
 Schizorchis Hansen, 1948
 Schizorchodes Bienek & Grundmann, 1973
 Sciurotaenia Haukisalmi, 2009
??? Semenoviella Spasski, 1951
 Shindeia Gaikwad & Shinde, 1985
 Shindeoandrya Shinde, Mahajan, Mahajan & Begum, 1999
 Sinaiotaenia Wertheim & Greenberg, 1971
 Spasskofuhrmina Palladwar & Kalyankar, 1989
 Stilesia Railliet, 1893
 Stringopotaenia Beveridge, 1978
 Taufikia Woodland, 1928
 Tenoraia Haukisalmi, Hardman, Hoberg & Henttonen, 2014
 Thysaniezia Skryabin, 1926
 Thysanosoma Diesing, 1835
 Thysanotaenia Beddard, 1911
 Timorenia Spasskii, 1987
 Triplotaenia Boas, 1902
 Triuterina Fuhrmann, 1922
 Tupaiataenia Schmidt & File, 1977
 Viscachataenia Denegri, Dophic, Elissondo & Beveridge, 2003
 Wallabicestus Schmidt, 1975
 Witenbergitaenia Wertheim, Schmidt & Greenberg, 1986
 Wyominia Scott, 1941
??? Zschokkea Fuhrmann, 1902
 Zschokkeella Ransom, 1909

References

Cestoda
Platyhelminthes families